Josh Bean may refer to:
Josh Bean (Canadian football) (born 1982), American football player
Joshua Bean ( 1818–1852), mayor of San Diego, California